Yavuz Eraydın (born 12 April 1976 in Trabzon, is a Turkish football goalkeeper who currently plays for TKİ Tavşanlı Linyitspor in the TFF First League.

References

1976 births
Living people
Turkish footballers
Trabzon Telekomspor footballers
Edirnespor footballers
Adanaspor footballers
Turanspor footballers
Sivasspor footballers
Bursaspor footballers
Çaykur Rizespor footballers
Kayseri Erciyesspor footballers
İstanbul Başakşehir F.K. players
Sportspeople from Trabzon
Association football goalkeepers